General elections will be held in Sweden on or before 13 September 2026 to elect the 349 members of the Riksdag. They in turn will elect the prime minister. In case of a snap election, the parliamentary term wouldn't be reset and general elections would still be held in September 2026 together with regional and municipal elections.

Opinion polls

Graphical summary

See also 
 Basic Laws of Sweden
 History of Sweden (1991–present)
 Politics of Sweden

References 

Sweden
General
General elections in Sweden